Lawrence Brown or Laurence Brown may refer to:

Lawrence Benjamin Brown (1893–1972), American pianist, composer, and arranger of African-American folk songs
Lawrence Brown (jazz trombonist) (1907–1988), American jazz trombonist
Laurie Brown (bishop) (1907–1993), Bishop of Birmingham, 1969–1977
Lawrence Michael Brown (born 1936), British material scientist
Dobie Gray (Lawrence Darrow Brown, 1940–2011), American singer and songwriter
Lawrence D. Brown (1940–2018), American professor of statistics at the University of Pennsylvania
Lawrence G. Brown (born 1943), American professor of mathematics at Purdue University

See also
Lawrence Brown House, historic home in Bartow, Florida, USA
Lawrence Brown Aircraft Co. (1926–1945), American aircraft manufacturer
Lawrence, Brown County, Wisconsin, USA
Larry Brown (disambiguation)
Laurie Brown (disambiguation)